The 2021–22 SSV Jahn Regensburg season is the 115th season in the club's football history. This was the club's fourth consecutive season in the 2. Bundesliga, the second tier of German football, following promotion from the 3. Liga in 2016–17.

The club also competed in the 2021–22 edition of the DFB-Pokal.

Events

Transfers

In

Out

Pre-season and friendlies

2. Bundesliga

2. Bundesliga fixtures & results

League table

DFB-Pokal

Statistics
.

|}

References

External links
 

SSV Jahn Regensburg seasons
Jahn Regensburg